The Nafsan language, also known as South Efate or Erakor, is a Southern Oceanic language spoken on the island of Efate in central Vanuatu. , there are approximately 6,000 speakers who live in coastal villages from Pango to Eton. The language's grammar has been studied by Nick Thieberger, who has produced a book of stories and a dictionary of the language. 

Nafsan is closely related to Nguna and to Lelepa. Based on shared features with southern Vanuatu languages (including echo–subject marking, and the free and preposed 1st-singular-possessive morphemes), Lynch (2001) suggests it could form part of a southern Vanuatu subgroup that includes New Caledonia.

Phonology 
Nafsan has a total of 20 phonemes consisting of 15 consonant and 5 vowel sounds.

As seen in the above chart, Nafsan's vowel phoneme inventory is that of a five-vowel system; this is one of the most commonly seen vowel inventories in any given language in the world and also especially evident in many Oceanic languages.  There is a distinction between short and long vowels but it is currently in a process of change that makes its status unclear.

Degemination 
In Nafsan, it is typical that two contiguous identical consonants occurring in a utterance undergo a process of degemination to be realised as a single consonant. In (1), the two contiguous identical consonants /n/ result in the phonetic attachment of demonstrative ne 'this' to the preceding word nawen ne [nawene] 'this sand'.

AD:Addressee deictic
DET:Determiner
DST:Distant
DUR:Durative
IR:Irrealis
IRR:Irrealis subject
NEG:Negative marker
PREP:Preposition
PS:Perfect subject
PSP:Prospective
REL:Relativiser
RS:Realis subject
TR:Transitive marker
TS:Transitive suffix
DP:Direct possession

Vowel centralisation 
High vowels in prepositions acting as a prefix often undergo a process of vowel centralisation to reduce the unstressed syllable. In (2), the high vowel /i/ in the preposition ki is reduced to [ə] when preceding the demonstrative nen 'that'.

Numerals 
The system of numerals in Nafsan is base-5 (quinary). Numbers two through five are distinct numerals that are then seen repeated in slight variation for the numbers seven to ten.  The pattern of the numerals can be seen in the table below.

Ralim iskei can be used as an example to see the method for displaying numbers ten and above in South Efate; the numeral for ten ralim is followed by its multiplier, which in this case is iskei for one. The term for and atmat is added after the multiplier with an additional numeral to form a number such as thirty seven:

Morphosyntax

Adnominal possession 
There are two ways of marking adnominal possession in Nafsan: through the use of a possessive pronoun (indirect possession), or directly on the noun (direct possession). Indirect possession is used for general possession, while direct possession is used for nouns that are closely associated items (e.g., body parts or products, kinship terms, etc.).

Indirect/general possession 
Indirect possession is morphosyntactically represented through the use of the possessive markers ni (of) or knen (of it), or of the presence of a possessive pronoun such as nakte (my/mine).

When possession is marked by a possessive pronoun, the pronouns follow the possessed NP:

ni possession: the preposition ni only occurs when the possessum is a noun. The NP follows the form of ‘possessed ni possessor’.

knen possession: This form is used as an inanimate referent, and often indicates a  previously mentioned participant in the discourse. It is positioned following the referent noun.

Direct possession 
Direct possession is used for inalienably possessed nouns. This is similar to other languages of Vanuatu that denote inalienable nouns as those that refer to relationships of part-whole association such as kinship terms, body parts or products, and associated parts (such as leaf/stem). These nouns take directly suffixed possession markers, however they can also occur without possessive marking when the possessor is encoded by a noun. The directly possessed (DP) suffix only attaches to the class of directly possessed nouns. For sg and 3p forms, an unpredictable vowel (V) may be inserted to aid DP suffixation.

If the directly possessed noun has no possessive suffix, the referent is presumed unknown or disembodied. Lack of possession also occurs when possession is encoded by the possessed noun preceding the possessor. As in the following example, the directly possessed noun rait (mother) is preceded by the noun tesa (child).

Negation 
Negation in Nafsan occurs in two ways. The first is the use of the intransitive verb tik (no, nothing), which can be used singularly or paired with the generic proclitic i= (3sgRS). The second, more widely used method, is through the use of discontinuous negative particles ta ... mau. Nafsan also does not differentiate between the negation of predicates and the negation of whole propositions.

Tik 
Tik is a verb translated as 'no' or 'nothing' and is used in similar contexts to its English translations.In the following example, tik is used in the same way as in the English translation.

Tik is also able to be made into a transitive verb through the addition of the transitive suffix -ki. When this occurs, the new gloss is 'to not have'. As such, in the following example there is no instance of a possessive verb being negated, instead the verb in the sentence (tik-ki) is negative in meaning. Another verb that is negative in meaning is tap, meaning 'to not do something'.

Negative particles 
The other way of negating predicates in Nafsan is through the use of two negative particles: ta(p)...mau. There is free variation between the use of ta and tap, ie the usage does not change according to any specific environment. Ta(p) is used preceding the proposition to be negated, and mau follows at the end of the sentence. The following examples show a positive sentence, which is then negated in the second example.

Sometimes, in the casual speech of young people predominantly, the second negative particle mau is left off, as seen in the following example.

The ta marker can also act a durative marker, so in negative sentences where both uses of ta are present it can result in two different readings of a sentence. In the first example below, reading the first ta as the negative one results in the whole proposition being negated. In the second example, exactly the same sentence, reading the second ta as the negative results in only the final verb (puet 'to take') being negated, thus creating a different meaning entirely.

Demonstratives 
There are three common forms of demonstratives in Nafsan: go 'that, near addressee', ne 'this', and nen 'that'. Similar to other Southern Oceanic languages, these forms serve both spatio-temporal and discourse deictic functions. The  form go 'that' is addressee-anchored referent to a spatial location nearer to the addressee from the speaker's perspective or something previously said by the addressee. This encoding is found in other languages of Vanuatu, such as Ske, that do not belong to the Central Vanuatu subgroup. There is an ability for syntactic ambiguity stemming from the two common functions encoded by demonstratives resulting in dual interpretations possible in some utterances. This is shown in example (16) and (17) where the noun kal 'digging stick' used with the demonstrative go can mean 'the digging stick near you' from the spatial sense of the form or 'the digging stick you talked about' from the discourse sense of the form.

In Nafsan, demonstratives have a noun-demonstrative word order which is typical of Austronesian languages according to the World Atlas of Language Structures. They typically appear in two locations within a sentence as shown in examples (18) and (19); as a modifier of the noun phrase and following a directional adverb, respectively. Otherwise, demonstratives must undergo nominalisation through the addition of the prefix te- (see 3.4.1) as they cannot occur as the only exponent of a noun phrase. While demonstratives can co-occur with lexical nouns and focal pronouns, they cannot do so with clitic pronouns in Nafsan. 

The form nen 'that' frequently occurs in collocation with the subordinator kin to create the English equivalent 'that which' as seen in example (19). As the form nen 'that' has the potentially to act as a demonstrative or a relativiser, the pause given between the two forms nen and kin indicates that it is likely the form nen 'that' is acting as a demonstrative that is modifying the noun phrase in this context. 

The demonstratives ne 'this', and nen 'that' also often occur in collocation with the noun mal 'time' to create the forms malne 'this time', as seen in example (20) and malnen 'that time'.

Distant Clitic 
The distinction between demonstrative forms ne 'this', and nen 'that' is a result of the distance-encoding clitic =n. This clitic can occur with several word classes as shown in the table below. Furthermore, like spatio-temporal demonstratives, it also has the deictic function of acting as a referent to previous parts of a discourse as shown in example (21).

Presentative Demonstrative 
The presentative morpheme is a demonstrative in Nafsan which has no paradigmatic relationship with the demonstrators detailed above. The form kia is often collocated with interrogatives such as, such as fei kia 'who here', and typically places emphasis on the preceding nominal or utterance, as shown in example (22). 

This function of drawing attention to its preceding forms has been used alongside fillers iwel, gawan, tkanwan which are all used to mean 'thus', 'that's the way', or 'like that', the latter of which is used at the end of the story as seen in example (23).

The emphatic purpose of this demonstrative is similar to those found in other languages of Vanuatu such as the form na- in Ske in example (24).

Nominalisation

'Te-' Nominalisation 
Nominalisation of demonstratives, verbs, possessives, ordinal numbers, quantifiers, and nouns occurs in Nafsan through the attachment of the determiner prefix te-. The productive process of te-nominalisation allows for the derivation of a large class of demonstrative pronouns. 

Example (25) reflects how addressee deixis is encoded in the demonstratives that have undergone te-nominalisation.

The prefix ka- is attached to nominals greater than one in Nafsan to form ordinal numbers which can then further gain the prefix te- to form a demonstrative as shown in example (26).

Pronoun and person marker 
There are mainly two classes of pronoun in Nafsan. The free pronoun and the bound pronoun.

Free pronoun 
The free pronouns incorporate three area, demonstrative pronouns, focal pronouns(function as both subject and object) and the oblique free pronoun (in either possessive or benefactive form).

Focal pronoun 
The focal pronoun (Lynch, 2000), also known as an independent pronoun (Crowley, 1998), functions as both the subject and object in an argument. It allows the pronoun itself to be the NP on their own unlike the bound pronouns which have to be attached to a verb. Focal pronouns express singular and plural but do not distinguish dual number.

1a) subject role

1b) object role

The examples (1a)& (1b) show the 1st person singular pronoun kineu performed as the subject and object correspondingly. And the following is a list of the focal pronouns in Nafsan.

Oblique free pronoun 
Oblique free pronoun function in possessive also benefactive case. For the possessive pronoun, it follows the possessed NP, generally made up of the preposition -nig ‘from’/ ‘of’.

2)  Possessive pronouns follow the possessed NP

There are variation forms of the suffix -nig , when it combines with an unstressed syllable, the high vowel will become lower. E.g. (niger →  neger)

Benefactive 
In the benefactive, the argument shares the same possessive morphology, yet the possessive morpheme is used in the pre-verbal position to express the beneficiary. The following example shows how beneficiary expressed by a pre-verbal position.

Bound Pronoun 
Bound pronoun comprises subject proclitics, object suffix for direct object and direct possessive. For the subject proclitics, there is neither separate set of dual object, nor oblique form. The obligatory subject proclitic pronouns are being seen as the arguments of the verb. For the pronominal suffixes of bound pronouns, the plural form is used to express any number that is greater than one.

Bound subject pronouns 
The proclitic subject pronoun cannot stand alone without attaching to the first element of the Verb compound. They are considered to be clitics since they can attach to any part of the Verb compound. Subject proclitics happened in three archetypes, realis, irrealis and perfect. The subject proclitic represents the subject argument since it is the only obligatory element in the sentence except for the verb.

Realis/irrealis pronominal 
Proclitic subjects distinguish realis and irrealis situation. The realis is unmarked, and the irrealis being marked in the subject to show the action is yet to be realised, including most of the future events but not all, all the imperatives and hortatives. There is a strong preference for the subject of desideratives, achievement and predicates to be using irrealis form.

4)realis and irrealis paradigm

The examples (4) show all realis form of pronouns in all cases except the subject of the verb mai ‘to come’ which is appeared in a desiderative complement.

Perfect pronominal 
When dealing with aspectual past (event that is over), regarding the speaking event and past time reference, the perfect form of proclitic is used. Generally, perfect proclitics directly followed by the perfective particle pe, yet it is not a necessary criterion. Notably, perfect proclitics never occur in imperatives. Perfect proclitics can be found in narratives that deal with long events like World War 2.

5) narrative

The example(5) shows the perfect proclitics being used to refer to those who are long dead in a narrative sentence.

Traditional stories in Nafsan often use perfect proclitic form as they are set in the past. The example(6) of an extract of a custom story telling also shows that perfective particle pe is not necessary to appear in perfect proclitic sentence.

6) Storytelling

Bound Object pronoun 
There are two separate types of object suffix, can be distinguished by the roles they encoded and the host they attached to. One type is for direct objects, the direct object suffixes attached to the object of the predicator to encode it. The other type is for oblique objects, the oblique object suffixes encode typically the location and the case of semi-transitive verbs. Based on the semantics of the semi-transitive verbs in the oblique case, the oblique object suffixes apply to movement to, at, or from a location. There are list of distinctive bound suffix being used in two types of object in table.2.

Direct object 
Object suffixes encode the object of derived transitive verbs, ambitransitive verbs, ditransitive verbs and of the preposition -ki. To reference an object in Nafsan can be either by an object suffix or a lexical NP. Therefore, object suffix cannot appeared in the Verb Complex while there is a referential lexical NP for object indication.

7) transitive verb/ preposition -ki

This is an example (7) showing how object suffix used in transitive verb. The intransitive verb pes-kerai takes the transitivising suffix -ki to become transitive which allows it to take the object suffix -k in the first use. However, to emphasize the object, the last clause used the focal pronoun ag ‘you(singular)’ instead of the object suffix.

8) ambitransitive verb

In general, ambitransitive verbs requires a transitive suffix before the addition of the object suffix. The example (8) shows that transitive suffix -e is added before the object suffix -r occurred.

9) ditransitive verb

The object suffix indicates the recipient when it is with a ditransitive verb. The example (9) shows when the suffix -r is used to encode the addresses.

Oblique object 
The oblique suffix has a locational meaning. The oblique case can also be indicating temporal and spatial references. The example shows the suffix -wes encoded the day that the race was held.

10) oblique suffix

Bound direct possessive pronouns 
The direct possessive suffix can only be attached to direct possessed nouns and reflexive/reciprocal morpheme yet not being a clitic. The 3 person singular is the most common form of direct possessive pronoun being found, even though there is other direct possessive pronoun see table.2. The following example(11) shows the 3sg direct possessive suffix -r.

11) direct possessive suffix

Common abbreviations 
Below is a table explaining the common abbreviations used in negation examples above:

Access to resources
Thieberger's field recordings have been archived with Paradisec:
 summary of the collection of materials in Nafsan
 listing of all material available via the Open Language Archives Community for Nafsan.

Notes
 Pages from:  

 Other references:

Further reading

References 
 Anon. 1868. Nalag nig Efat. Trans. D. Morrison. Sydney: Mason, Firt, nigar asler (Mason, Firth and Co). 
 Anon. 1892. Tusi nalag Efate Niu Ebrites. Sydney: F. Cunninghame and Co. 
 Anon. 1979. Natus nalag (213 pp). 
 Bible. 1864. Nadus iskei nig Fat. Aneityum: Mission Press. 
 Bible. 1866. Nafsanwi nig Iesu Krist nag Mark.  Trans. D. Morrison. Sydney: Sheriff and Downing. 
 Bible. 1874. Kenesis natus a bei nag Moses ki mtir i. Trans. Cosh, J. Sydney: British and Foreign Bible Society. 
 Bible. 1875? Nafisan nafousien. Sydney: F. Cunninghame and Co. 
 Bible. 1883. The Gospel according to Luke. Trans. Macdonald, D.D. Melbourne: M.L. Hutchinson. 
 Bible. 1885. The Gospel according to John, Tus Nanrognrogona Uia ni Iesu Kristo nag Ioane i mitiria. Trans. Mackenzie, J., Macdonald, D.D. Sydney: F. Cunninghame and Co. 
 Bible. 1919.  Natus bei ni nafisan ni Efate. Sydney: Epworth Press. 
 Bible. 1919. Tusi tab fao (New Testament).  Trans. Mackenzie, J., Macdonald, D.D. Melbourne: British and Foreign Bible Society. 
 Bible. 1923. Scripture History. Sydney: Epworth Printing and Publishing House. 
 Bible. 1923. Nafakoron ni aliat. Erakor Efate, New Hebrides. Nouméa: Imprimerie A.-L. Laubreaux. 
 Bible. n.d. Nawisien nig Nagmer Apostol. Sydney: F. Cunninghame and Co. 
 Clark, Ross. 1973. Transitivity and case in eastern Oceanic languages. Oceanic Linguistics 12(1–2). 559–606. 
 ––––– 1978. The New Hebridean outliers. In Wurm, S.A. and L.Carrington, (eds.), Second International Conference on Austronesian Linguistics: proceedings. Fascicle 2: eastern Austronesian. (Pacific Linguistics Series) Department of Linguistics, Research School of Pacific Studies, The Australian National University. 911–928. 
 –––––  1982. "Necessary" and "unnecessary" borrowing. In Halim, A. (ed.), Papers from the Third International Conference on Austronesian Linguistics. Vol.3: Accent on variety. C 76 ed. (Pacific Linguistics Series): Department of Linguistics, Research School of Pacific Studies, The Australian National University. 137–143. 
 –––––  1985. The Efate dialects. Te Reo 28.:3–35. 
 –––––  1996. Linguistic consequences of the Kuwae eruption. In J. M. Davidson, G. Irwin, B. F. Leach, A. Pawley and D. Brown (eds.), Oceanic culture history: essays in honour of Roger Green. New Zealand Journal of Archaeology Special Publication. 275–285. 
 –––––  n.d. The Efate-Tongoa dialects (Ms). 
 Codrington, Robert Henry (R. H.). 1885. The Melanesian Languages. Oxford: Clarendon Press. 
 Crowley, Terry. 1998. An Erromangan (Sye) Grammar. Honolulu: University of Hawai’i Press. 
 Lynch, John. 2000. South Efate phonological history. Oceanic Linguistics 39(2):320–338. 
 ––––– 2000. A grammar of Anejom. Canberra: Pacific Linguistics. 
 ––––– 2001. The linguistic history of Southern Vanuatu. Canberra: Pacific Linguistics, Research School of Pacific and Asian Studies, Australian National University.
 ––––– 2004. The Efate-Erromango Problem in Vanuatu Subgrouping. Oceanic Linguistics 43(2):311–338.

 Thieberger, Nicholas. 2004. Topics in the grammar and documentation of South Efate, an Oceanic language of Central Vanuatu. PhD thesis, Department of Linguistics and Applied Linguistics, University of Melbourne.
  ––––– 2006a. A Grammar of South Efate: An Oceanic Language of Vanuatu Oceanic Linguistics Special Publication, No. 33. Honolulu: University of Hawai'i Press. 
  ––––– 2006b. The benefactive construction in South Efate. Oceanic Linguistics, Volume 45, no. 2, 297-310.
  ––––– 2007. The demise of serial verbs in South Efate. Diana Eades, John Lynch and Jeff Siegel (eds.), Language Description, History and Development: Linguistic Indulgence in Memory of Terry Crowley. Amsterdam: Benjamins. 237-251.
  ––––– 2011a. Natrauswen nig Efat. Melbourne: The author. . 
  ––––– 2011b. A dictionary of South Efate. Melbourne: The author. .
  ––––– 2012. Mood and Transitivity in South Efate. Oceanic Linguistics. Volume 51, no. 2, 387-401.
 Thieberger, Nicholas and Chris Ballard. 2008. Daniel Macdonald and the 'compromise literary dialect' in Efate, central Vanuatu. Oceanic Linguistics, Volume 47, no.2: 365-382
 Thieberger, Nicholas, and members of the Erakor community. 2021. A Dictionary of Nafsan, South Efate, Vanuatu: M̃p̃et Nafsan ni Erakor. Honolulu: UHPress.
An Android app version of the dictionary can be downloaded here.
 Payne, Thomas Edward. 1997. Describing morphosyntax: a guide for field linguists. Cambridge, U.K.; New York: Cambridge University Press.

External links
Topics in the grammar and documentation of South Efate, an Oceanic language of Central Vanuatu by Nicholas Thieberger
Dictionary of South Efate by Nicholas Thieberger
A collection of texts in the language with media, by Nicholas Thieberger
 Nafsan (South Efate) DoReCo corpus compiled by Nick Thieberger. Audio recordings of narrative texts with transcriptions time-aligned at the phone level, translations, and time-aligned morphological annotations.

Central Vanuatu languages
Languages of Vanuatu